In the United Kingdom and Republic of Ireland, a county town is the most important town or city in a county. It is usually the location of administrative or judicial functions within a county and the place where the county's members of Parliament are elected. Following the establishment of the English county councils in 1889, the headquarters of the new councils were usually located in the county town of each county. However, the concept of a county town pre-dates the establishment of these councils.

The concept of a county town is ill-defined and unofficial. Some counties have their administrative bodies located elsewhere. For example, Lancaster is the county town of Lancashire, but the county council is located in Preston. Some county towns are no longer situated within the administrative county because of changes in the county's boundaries. For example, Nottingham is administered by a unitary authority separate from the rest of Nottinghamshire.

UK county towns, pre-19th-century reforms

Historic counties of England
This list shows county towns prior to the reforms of 1889.

Historic counties of Scotland

Historic counties of Wales
This list shows county towns prior to the reforms of 1889.

Historic counties of Northern Ireland

Note – Despite the fact that Belfast is the capital of Northern Ireland, it is not the county town of any county. Greater Belfast straddles two counties (Antrim and Down).

UK county towns post 19th-century reforms
With the creation of elected county councils in 1889 the location of administrative headquarters in some cases moved away from the traditional county town. Furthermore, in 1965 and 1974 there were major boundary changes in England and Wales and administrative counties were replaced with new metropolitan and non-metropolitan counties.  The boundaries underwent further alterations between 1995 and 1998 to create unitary authorities and some of the ancient counties and county towns were restored.  (Note: not all headquarters are or were called County Halls or Shire Halls e.g.: Cumbria County Council's HQ up until 2016 was called The Courts and have since moved to Cumbria House.) Before 1974 many of the county halls were located in towns and cities that had the status of a county borough i.e.: a borough outside of the county council's jurisdiction.

England

Wales

 Due to its better transport links and more central location, some administrative functions were moved to Llangefni.
 Cardigan was often still referred to as 'the county town' due to the name link. However, assizes were held at Lampeter while Aberystwyth housed the administration of the county council. Aberystwyth was therefore the de facto county town.
 Due to its better transport links and more central location, some administrative functions were moved to Llandrindod Wells.

Republic of Ireland
The follow lists the location of the administration of each of the 31 local authorities in the Republic of Ireland, with 26 of the traditional counties.

Jamaica

Jamaica's three counties were established in 1758 to facilitate the holding of courts along the lines of the British county court system, with each county having a county town. The counties have no current administrative relevance.

See also
 Administrative centre
 County seat

References

Capitals
Towns in Ireland
Towns in the United Kingdom